Kaarsild ('Arch Bridge') is a pedestrian bridge in Tartu, Estonia. The bridge connects the city's centre and the Ülejõe District.

The bridge was built in 1957–1959 on the site of the former Stone Bridge; this bridge was destroyed during WWII.

In 2017, the bridge was renovated.

At night, the bridge is illuminated with lighting effects.

References

Bridges in Tartu